Howard Hadden Halladay (June 15, 1875 – January 23, 1952) was a farmer, insurance agent, and Canadian federal politician. He served as a member of the House of Commons of Canada from 1917 to 1921, sitting as a Unionist candidate in government. He also served as a municipal politician from 1913 to 1918 as mayor of Hanna, Alberta.

Political career
Halladay began his political career on the municipal level, serving as mayor of Hanna, Alberta, from 1913 to 1918.

While still mayor he ran for a seat in the Canadian House of Commons in the 1917 Canadian federal election. In that election he ran as the Unionist coalition candidate. He defeated three other candidates by a comfortable margin including future Alberta MLA Daniel Galbraith to take the new seat. Halladay served as a Member of Parliament for a single term before retiring at dissolution in 1921.

References

External links
 

1875 births
1952 deaths
Members of the House of Commons of Canada from Alberta
Unionist Party (Canada) MPs
Mayors of places in Alberta